Empress Xie may refer to:

Empress Xie Fanjing, wife of Emperor Shun of Liu Song
Empress Xie (Xiaozong), wife of Emperor Xiaozong of Song
Empress Xie Daoqing, wife of Emperor Lizong of Song

Xie